International Community School (ICS) is a co-educational World International Baccalaureate School located in Marylebone, London, teaching students aged from three to 18 years old.

History
The Toettcher family established International Community School (ICS) in 1979. The school was set up to teach children English within a full curriculum International School. Since then the School has broadened its scope to offer a full curriculum for children between 3 and 18 years old.

In 2008, the International Baccalaureate made ICS an IB World School, accredited to teach the Primary Years Programme (PYP) and Middle Years Programme (MYP, and Diploma Programme (DP).

In 2010, ICS was awarded accreditation to teach the IB Diploma, becoming one of only five schools in the UK to teach all three school-age levels of the IB.

ICS was acquired by the NACE Schools group in 2017.  The group was purchased by Providence Equity Partners that same year and is now known as Globeducate.

ICS was previously non-selective Ofsted-inspected, and is now inspected by Independent Schools Inspectorate (ISI).

Controversy 
A supervised school trip to Brazil in 2013 ended in tragedy when children were allowed to drink tequila in a night bar and one pupil was shot dead.  The school subsequently underwent a management and then ownership change.

Curriculum
ICS teaches the International Baccalaureate curriculum through the three programmes:
 PYP for students aged 3–11 years
 MYP for students aged 11–16 years
 IB Diploma for students aged 16 and over

References

External links
International Community School Website
International Community School Ofsted Report
International Community School ISI Report

1979 establishments in England
Educational institutions established in 1979
Private co-educational schools in London
Private schools in the City of Westminster
International Baccalaureate schools in England